Lung compliance, or pulmonary compliance, is a measure of the lung's ability to stretch and expand (distensibility of elastic tissue). In clinical practice it is separated into two different measurements, static compliance and dynamic compliance. Static lung compliance is the change in volume for any given applied pressure. Dynamic lung compliance is the compliance of the lung at any given time during actual movement of air.

Low compliance indicates a stiff lung (one with high elastic recoil) and can be thought of as a thick balloon – this is the case often seen in fibrosis. High compliance indicates a pliable lung (one with low elastic recoil) and can be thought of as a grocery bag – this is the case often seen in emphysema. Compliance is highest at moderate lung volumes, and much lower at volumes which are very low or very high. The compliance of the lungs demonstrate lung hysteresis; that is, the compliance is different on inspiration and expiration for identical volume.

Calculation
Pulmonary compliance is calculated using the following equation, where ΔV is the change in volume,  and ΔP is the change in pleural pressure:

For example, if a patient inhales 500 mL of air from a spirometer with an intrapleural pressure before inspiration of −5 cm H2O and −10 cm H2O at the end of inspiration. Then:

Static compliance (Cstat)
Static compliance represents pulmonary compliance during periods without gas flow, such as during an inspiratory pause. It can be calculated with the formula:

where 
VT = tidal volume; 

Pplat = plateau pressure; 
PEEP = positive end-expiratory pressure. 
Pplat is measured at the end of inhalation and prior to exhalation by using an inspiratory hold maneuver. During this maneuver, airflow is transiently (~0.5 sec) discontinued, which eliminates the effects of airway resistance. Pplat is never bigger than PIP and is typically <10 cm H2O lower than PIP when airway resistance is not elevated.

Dynamic compliance (Cdyn)
Dynamic compliance represents pulmonary compliance during periods of gas flow, such as during active inspiration. Dynamic compliance is always lesser than or equal to static lung compliance because PIP − PEEP is always greater than Pplat − PEEP. It can be calculated using the following equation,

where 
Cdyn = Dynamic compliance; 
VT = tidal volume; 
PIP = Peak inspiratory pressure (the maximum pressure during inspiration); 
PEEP = Positive End Expiratory Pressure: 

Alterations in airway resistance, lung compliance and chest wall compliance influence Cdyn.

Dimensionality and Physical Analogues
The dimensions of compliance in respiratory physiology are inconsistent with the dimensions of compliance in physics-based applications. In physiology, 

whereas in newtonian physics, compliance is defined as the inverse of the elastic stiffness constant k,

Pulmonary compliance is analogous to capacitance.

Clinical significance
Lung compliance is an important measurement in respiratory physiology.

 fibrosis is associated with a decrease in pulmonary compliance.
 emphysema/COPD may be associated with an increase in pulmonary compliance due to the loss of alveolar and elastic tissue.

Pulmonary surfactant increases compliance by decreasing the surface tension of water. The internal surface of the alveolus is covered with a thin coat of fluid. The water in this fluid has a high surface tension, and provides a force that could collapse the alveolus. The presence of surfactant in this fluid breaks up the surface tension of water, making it less likely that the alveolus can collapse inward. If the alveolus were to collapse, a great force would be required to open it, meaning that compliance would decrease drastically. Lung volume at any given pressure during inhalation is less than the lung volume at any given pressure during exhalation, which is called hysteresis.

Functional significance of abnormally high or low compliance
Low compliance indicates a stiff lung and means extra work is required to bring in a normal volume of air. This occurs as the lungs in this case become fibrotic, lose their distensibility and become stiffer.

In a highly compliant lung, as in emphysema, the elastic tissue is damaged by enzymes. These enzymes are secreted by leukocytes (white blood cells) in response to a variety of inhaled irritants, such as cigarette smoke. Patients with emphysema have a very high lung compliance due to the poor elastic recoil. They have extreme difficulty exhaling air. In this condition extra work is required to get air out of the lungs. In addition, patients often have difficulties inhaling air as well. This is due to the fact that a highly compliant lung results in many Atelectasis which makes inflation difficult. Compliance also increases with increasing age.

Both peak inspiratory and plateau pressure increase when elastic resistance increases or when pulmonary compliance decreases (e.g. during abdominal insufflation, ascites, intrinsic lung disease, obesity, pulmonary edema, tension pneumothorax). On the other hand, only peak inspiratory pressure increases (plateau pressure unchanged) when airway resistance increases (e.g. airway compression, bronchospasm, mucous plug, kinked tube, secretions, foreign body).

Compliance decreases in the following cases:

 Supine position
 Laparoscopic surgical interventions
 Severe restrictive pathologies
 Chronic restrictive pathologies
 Hydrothorax
 Pneumothorax
 High standing of a diaphragm
 Acute asthma attacks, where increased compliance also occurs for an unclear reason

References

إعداد الطالبة :إبتهال إبراهيم عثمان أحمد 
Respiratory therapy
Respiratory physiology
Mathematics in medicine